Theerayut Duangpimy (Thai ธีรยุทธ ด้วงพิมาย ) is a Thai former footballer. He currently plays for Thailand Division 1 League side Samut Prakan Customs United F.C.

References

External links
Profile at Thaipremierleague.co.th

1982 births
Living people
Theerayut Duangpimy
Theerayut Duangpimy
Association football defenders
Theerayut Duangpimy